Mike Hollingshead is an American professional storm chaser, photographer and videographer from Blair, Nebraska. His work has been covered by NPR, numerous photography magazines and websites, and on the cover of National Geographic. It is also featured in films and television, such as Take Shelter, The Fifth Estate, and the series finale of Dexter. In 2008 Hollingshead released his first book titled Adventures in Tornado Alley: The Storm Chasers with co-author Eric Nguyen.

Some of his photographs have been circulated by e-mail without his permission and without giving him credit or payment, in some cases misidentified as being of Hurricane Katrina. He now adds a digital watermark to his photographs to discourage this.

References

External links 
 Extreme Instability (Hollingshead's website)
 Facebook page
 Twitter account
 Youtube channel
 Vimeo
 Corbis photographer profile
 

Storm chasers
Photographers from Nebraska
Landscape photographers
Nature photographers
Living people
People from Blair, Nebraska
Year of birth missing (living people)